Hjørdis Nerheim (20 June 1940 – 30 March 2020) was a Norwegian philosopher. She was appointed professor at the University of Tromsø from 1995. Her research interests centered on the philosophy of Immanuel Kant, as well as ethics, political philosophy, esthetics, and the philosophy of science.

Career
Nerheim received her education in Oslo, Paris and Tübingen, and graduated as dr. philos. in Philosophy from the University of Oslo in 1986, the first Scandinavian woman to do so. She was appointed professor at the University of Tromsø from 1995, and was the first female Scandinavian professor of philosophy.  

Her fields of interest included the philosophy of Kant, as well as ethics, political philosophy, esthetics, and the philosophy of science.

Personal life
Nerheim was married to professor of philosophy . She died on 30 March 2020, at the age of 79.

Selected works

References

1940 births
2020 deaths
Norwegian philosophers
University of Oslo alumni
Academic staff of the University of Tromsø